Zayed Abdulla Braik Saeed Al-Ameri (Arabic:زايد العامري; born 14 January 1997) is an Emirati professional footballer who plays as a striker for Al Jazira and the United Arab Emirates national team.  On 3 February 2022, Zayed was the first player in a FIFA competition to have a goal disallowed due to offsides called by the semi automated offside VAR system.

References

Emirati footballers
1997 births
Living people
Place of birth missing (living people)
Al Jazira Club players
UAE Pro League players
Footballers at the 2018 Asian Games
Asian Games bronze medalists for the United Arab Emirates
Asian Games medalists in football
Medalists at the 2018 Asian Games
Association football forwards